Granulina liei is a species of very small sea snail, a marine gastropod mollusk or micromollusk in the family Granulinidae.

Description

Distribution
This marine species occurs off Flores Island, Indonesia.

References

 Bozzetti, L., 2008. Granulina liei (Gastropoda: Hypsogastropoda: Cystiscidae) nuova specie dall'isola di Flores. Malacologia Mostra Mondiale 61: 11

Granulinidae
Gastropods described in 2008